Constantina "Connie" Allen (September 24, 1926 – August 30, 1991) was an American singer and musician. She recorded the song "Rocket 69" in 1951, backed by Todd Rhodes and His Toddlers (also called the Todd Rhodes Orchestra).

Other songs
In addition to "Rocket 69", Allen also performed several other songs with Todd Rhodes as well as Paul "Hucklebuck" Williams. Some of her songs include; "Your Daddy's Doggin' Around", "Hard Working Woman", "Sugar in my Bowl", "What's Happening", and "You'll Never Change Me".

References

External links

1926 births
1991 deaths
American rhythm and blues singers
20th-century American singers